John Bonner is an English businessman, currently an owner of Orlando City Soccer Club.

An engineering graduate, John moved to Florida in 2004 after a successful business career initially in the UK amusement and gaming industry then later as a venture capitalist. In 2008 he opened Big Fin Seafood Kitchen.

Now living in the Dr Phillips area, John moved to the US to further the interests of his various UK companies, He has achieved this successfully whilst also helping his partner Bobby Moore create the widely acclaimed Big Fin Seafood Kitchen restaurant concept in the Dellagio on Sand Lake Road.

A lifetime soccer fan and fervent supporter of twice European champions Nottingham Forest, John is delighted to be involved with Orlando City, "I firmly believe soccer has a great future in the USA and particularly here in Orlando. I'm really looking forward to working with everyone concerned to hopefully bring some more sporting success to Central Florida."

References 

Living people
British businesspeople
Year of birth missing (living people)